My Mother Likes Women is a 2002 Spanish comedy film directed by Inés París and Daniela Fejerman. The film stars Leonor Watling, Rosa Maria Sardà, María Pujalte, Silvia Abascal, and Eliska Sirova. My Mother Likes Women premiered in Spain on 11 January 2002. The theme song of the same title was written by Andy Chango.

Plot 
Elvira, an attractive but insecure twenty-something, joins her sisters Jimena and Sol to celebrate the birthday of their mother, Sofía. A divorced concert pianist, Sofía announces that she's fallen in love but is interrupted by the doorbell as she describes her new partner. While the three gleefully speculate about their mother's new boyfriend, their joy suddenly gives way to shock when she returns with Eliska, and the sisters realize that their mother is a lesbian.

The young women handle the shock in different ways. Elvira confides in her psychiatrist, while Sol composes a song about her mother and her lesbian relationship for her band. Jimena doesn't act out in any similar manner, but her husband becomes concerned about how his mother-in-law's sexual orientation affects his image at work.

When her daughters find out that Sofía has given the much younger Eliska a significant amount of money, they become suspicious of Eliska and plot to find a way to get their mother to break up with her.

Cast 
Leonor Watling as Elvira
Rosa Maria Sardà as Sofía
María Pujalte as Jimena
Silvia Abascal as Sol
Eliska Sirova as Eliska
Chisco Amado as Miguel
Álex Angulo as the book editor
Aitor Mazo as psychiatrist
Xabier Elorriaga as Carlos

Release

Home media 
The DVD, with English subtitles, was released in North America (Region 1) by Wolfe Video on May 10, 2005. A video of the theme song scene from the film appears on the Region 2 DVD as an extra feature, with the performance of the song by Andy Chango and Ariel Rot mixed into the footage.

References

External links 
 
  A mi madre le gustan las mujeres at BFI
  My Mother Likes Women at Cineuropa
  A mi madre le gustan las mujeres at Gynocine, University of Massachusetts Amherst
 
 A mi madre le gustan las mujeres at Lumiere
  A mi madre le gustan las mujeres at SensaCine

2002 films
2002 comedy films
Films shot in Madrid
Lesbian-related films
2000s Spanish-language films
Spanish LGBT-related films
Spain in fiction
2000s Spanish films